Harry Lewis "Bill" Bailey (November 19, 1881 – October 27, 1967) was an outfielder in Major League Baseball.

External links

1881 births
1967 deaths
Baseball players from Ohio
New York Highlanders players
Major League Baseball outfielders
People from Shawnee, Perry County, Ohio
Mansfield Giants players
Newark Cotton Tops players
Dayton Veterans players
Canton Watchmakers players
Clarksburg Bees players
Lancaster Red Roses players
Newark Indians players
Atlanta Crackers players
St. Paul Apostles players
Columbus Senators players